Gorka Verdugo Markotegui (born 4 November 1978) is a Spanish professional road bicycle racer, who last rode for UCI ProTour team .

Born in Etxarri-Aranatz, Navarre, Verdugo has not yet won any races, but made his Giro d'Italia debut in 2005 (86th) and his Tour de France debut in 2006 (75th). His highest placing in the Tour de France was in 2011 (25th), however despite completing it an impressive 6 times he has never had a top ten finish in any stage of the race. Considered a reliable team rider, his is best individual tour performance was on stage 16 in the 2007 Tour de France where in a breakaway he gained enough points in the mountains classification to finish 11th overall in Paris. He finished 11th overall in the 2012 Vuelta a Espana, marking his best grand tour finish yet.

Career achievements

Major results

2006
 10th Overall Clásica Internacional de Alcobendas
2008
 5th Overall Volta a la Comunitat Valenciana
 7th Overall Paris–Nice
 10th Overall Volta a Catalunya
 10th Subida a Urkiola
2009
 8th Klasika Primavera
2012
 3rd Gran Piemonte
2013
 7th Prueba Villafranca de Ordizia

Grand Tour general classification results timeline

References

External links 

1978 births
Living people
People from Barranca (comarca)
Spanish male cyclists
Cyclists from Navarre